Bonushi (also Romanized as Bonūshī; also known as Baramshī and Bonshī) is a village in Gafr and Parmon Rural District, Gafr and Parmon District, Bashagard County, Hormozgan Province, Iran. At the 2006 census, its population was 8, in 4 families.

References 

Populated places in Bashagard County